The Tamar Group is an early Devonian to early Carboniferous geologic group in south Devon and north Cornwall in southwest England. The name is derived from the valley of the River Tamar on the Devon/Cornwall border. The Group comprises (in ascending order) the Torquay Limestone, Tavy and Burraton formations. Some of the rocks are fossiliferous.

See also

 List of fossiliferous stratigraphic units in England

References

 

Geological groups of the United Kingdom
Geologic formations of England
Devonian System of Europe
Devonian England
Geology of Cornwall
Geology of Devon